Frederick Roy Dunsmore (March 30, 1929 – May 13, 2014) was a Canadian ice hockey centerman who was runner-up for Manitoba's "Athlete of the Century".

He played baseball for the Winnipeg Goldeyes briefly in 1954.

Awards and achievements 
Allan Cup Championship (1964)
Played in the World Championships for Canada’s National Team (1966)
Inducted into the Manitoba Sports Hall of Fame and Museum in 1989
"Honoured Member" of the Manitoba Hockey Hall of Fame

References

External links

Fred Dunsmore's biography at Manitoba Hockey Hall of Fame
Fred Dunsmore’s biography at Manitoba Sports Hall of Fame and Museum
Fred Dunsmore’s biography at Manitoba Sports Hall of Fame

1929 births
2014 deaths
Brandon Elks players
Canadian ice hockey centres
Ice hockey people from Winnipeg
Winnipeg Canadians players